The following radio stations broadcast on FM frequency 101.4 MHz:

China 
 CNR China Rural Radio in Qingtongxia
 CNR China Traffic Radio in Harbin
 CNR The Voice of China in Chengde, Fushun, and Panzhihua
 TJTRS Tianjini Economical Radio

India
 AIR FM Rainbow in Chennai, Tamil Nadu

New Zealand
 RNZ National in Auckland, Tauranga and Dunedin

United Kingdom
Classic FM at Bristol & Inverness
 Flex FM
 Smooth East Midlands

References

Lists of radio stations by frequency